Podocarpus epiphyticus is a species of conifer in the Yew Pine family (Podocarpaceae). It is found only in Myanmar (Burma). It was discovered by David J. DeLaubenfels and John Silba in the Kachin state in the early 1980's.  It is most notable for being the only epiphyte in the Podocarp family.

References

epiphyticus
Least concern plants
Taxonomy articles created by Polbot